{{DISPLAYTITLE:C14H10}}
The molecular formula C14H10 (molar mass: 178.23 g/mol) may refer to:

 Anthracene
 Diphenylacetylene
 Phenanthrene
 9-Methylene-fluorene, or dibenzofulvene (DBF)

Molecular formulas